Parides, commonly called cattlehearts, is a genus of swallowtail butterflies in the family Papilionidae. They are found in the Americas (Neotropical realm).

Species
Listed alphabetically within groups according to Möhn et al., with annotations according to Wilts et al. (2014):

species group: ascanius (disputed: basal/plesiomorphic?)
Parides agavus (Drury, 1782)
Parides alopius (Godman & Salvin, [1890]) – white-dotted cattleheart
Parides ascanius (Cramer, [1775]) – Fluminense swallowtail
Parides bunichus (Hübner, [1821])
Parides gundlachianus (C. & R. Felder, 1864) – Cuban cattleheart (anchises group?)
Parides montezuma (Westwood, 1842) – Montezuma's cattleheart (possibly new panthonus group)
Parides phalaecus (Hewitson, 1869)
Parides photinus (Doubleday, 1844) – pink-spotted cattleheart (basal in anchises group?)
Parides proneus (Hübner, [1831])

species group: klagesi (incertae sedis)
Parides klagesi (Ehrmann, 1904)

species group: chabrias
Parides chabrias (Hewitson, 1852)
Parides hahneli (Staudinger, 1882) – Hahnel's Amazonian swallowtail
Parides mithras (Grose-Smith, 1902)
Parides pizarro (Staudinger, 1884) – formerly P. steinbachi (ascanius group/incertae sedis?)
Parides quadratus (Staudinger, 1890)
Parides vercingetorix (Oberthür, 1888) – formerly P. coelus (ascanius group/incertae sedis?)

species group: aeneas
Parides aeneas (Linnaeus, 1758)
Parides aglaope (Gray, [1853]) (ascanius group/incertae sedis?)
Parides burchellanus (Westwood, 1872) (possibly new panthonus group)
Parides echemon (Hübner, [1813])
Parides eurimedes (Stoll, [1782]) – pink-checked cattleheart or mylotes cattleheart
Parides lysander (Cramer, [1775]) – Lysander cattleheart (possibly basalmost living species of group)
Parides neophilus (Geyer, 1837) – neophilus cattleheart
Parides orellana (Hewitson, 1852) (tentatively placed here)
Parides panthonus (Cramer, [1780]) – panthonus cattleheart (possibly new panthonus group)
Parides tros (Fabricius, 1793)
Parides zacynthus (Fabricius, 1793)

species group: sesostris (sister to aeneas and/or anchises group/s?)
Parides childrenae (Gray, 1832) – green-celled cattleheart
Parides sesostris (Cramer, [1779]) – emerald-patched cattleheart

species group: anchises
Parides anchises (Linnaeus, 1758) – Anchises cattleheart
Parides cutorina (Staudinger, 1898) (ascanius group/incertae sedis?)
Parides erithalion (Boisduval, 1836) – variable cattleheart
Parides iphidamas (Fabricius, 1793) – Transandean cattleheart
Parides panares (Gray, [1853]) – wedge-spotted cattleheart
Parides phosphorus (H.W. Bates, 1861) (ascanius group/incertae sedis?)
Parides vertumnus (Cramer, [1779])

References

Gerardo Lamas (edited by) (2004). Atlas of Neotropical Lepidoptera. Checklist: Part4A. Hesperioidea-Papilionoidea. Scientific Publishers, Inc., Gainesville, FL. 
Jeffrey Glassberg (2007). A Swift Guide to the Butterflies of Mexico and Central America. Sunstreak Books Inc. 
Racheli, Tommaso an Olmisani. Luca 1998. A cladistic analysis of the genus Parides Hubner, [1819], based on androconial structures (Lepidoptera: Papilionidae). Neue Ent. Nachr. (Marktleuthen),41:119-131.pdf
Edwin Möhn, 2006 Schmetterlinge der Erde, Butterflies of the world Part XXVI (26), Papilionidae XIII. Parides. Edited by Erich Bauer and Thomas Frankenbach Keltern: Goecke & Evers; Canterbury: Hillside Books.  (Supplement 13 in English - by Racheli)
Rothschild, W. and Jordan, K. (1906). A revision of the American Papilios. Novitates Zoologicae 13: 411-752. online (and as pdf) (Facsimile edition ed. P.H. Arnaud, 1967).

External links

BOA Photographs of type specimens.
Parides MNH
Pteron

 
Papilionidae
Papilionidae of South America
Butterfly genera
Taxa named by Jacob Hübner
Taxonomy articles created by Polbot
Taxobox binomials not recognized by IUCN